"Jail" is a song by American rapper Kanye West from his tenth studio album, Donda (2021). The song includes vocals from fellow American rapper Jay-Z. Towards the end of the album, another version of the song titled "Jail pt 2" appears, which includes vocals from rapper DaBaby and singer Marilyn Manson. Some critics compared the song to West's previous single "Black Skinhead" (2013) for its similar musical style.
It won the award for Best Rap Song at the 2022 Grammy Awards.

Background
West heavily contributed production to fellow rapper Jay-Z's sixth studio album The Blueprint in 2001, beginning a creative bond between the two. He has since helped produce various Jay-Z albums, while the rapper has been featured on numerous records by West, including his fifth studio album My Beautiful Dark Twisted Fantasy (2010). West and Jay-Z's collaborative album Watch the Throne was released in 2011, though they had a falling out five years later when West complained about him during the Saint Pablo Tour. Jay-Z addressed the fallout on the intro to his 13th studio album 4:44 (2017) and also assured in a promotional interview that he needed to speak with West for resolving their "family business", before the latter alleged their issues started after his wedding to Kim Kardashian in 2014.

On July 22, 2021, West ended the first listening event for Donda at Mercedes-Benz Stadium in Atlanta by playing a song that includes a verse from Jay-Z. The verse was reportedly recorded at 4pm on the previous day, apparently being rushed by Jay-Z for the event. The song's title was unveiled as "Jail" and during the album's third listening party at Soldier Field in Chicago, a version was played that replaced Jay-Z's verse with one from fellow rapper DaBaby. The replacement was widely condemned by fans, due to DaBaby's July 2021 homophobic rant. The final version re-added Jay-Z and removed DaBaby, marking the first track to include him and West since they both appeared on Drake's "Pop Style" (2016).

Critical reception

"Jail" received mixed reviews. Thomas Hobbs of The Guardian was unimpressed by West's lyrics on the track, describing them as "blunted" when compared to his previous work; he also considered its "dad-rock riffs" to be "slightly flat" and its melody "meandering". In her review for The Independent, Roisin O'Connor condemned the "sluggish one-two punch of the motif" as derivative of the "superior jabs" on Kendrick Lamar's "Humble" (2017). AllMusic's Fred Thomas dubbed it "a banger with no bang" besides its "last seconds". Conversely, Paul Thomas of Rolling Stone described it as "pure catharsis" and "clear-eyed" in its examination of "the threat police pose", highlighting it as one of the tracks off Donda which display a "sincere darkness".  In his review for Variety, Chris Willman called it a "pleasingly genre-crossing surprise" with "power chords and anthemic chorus lines that somebody like Imagine Dragons might give their dragons' eye teeth for". Clashs Mike Milenko considered it "a half-decent Kanye cut".

Jay-Z's appearance divided critics. Jon Caramanica of The New York Times simply described it as "decent", while Tom Breihan of Stereogum wrote that "it's not peak Jay"; he considered his "underwhelming" verse to be inferior to the other guest appearances on Donda, and assessed that he "gets through his awkward verse on charisma and accumulated goodwill". Thomas panned his "atrociously written" verse, arguing that "it sounds like a rehearsal take from someone who knows he's written C-grade material". HipHopDXs David Aaron Brake called it "one of the worst verses of his career", and joked that "Kanye awoke him from a nap and asked him for some quick bars in 30 minutes or less". In contrast, Nina Hernandez of The A.V. Club hailed it as "one of Jay's most successful feature verses in several years" and a "clear high point" on Donda. Similarly, Milenko found Jay-Z to be "at his most recent best, sneering into the mic with a cockiness that is unmatched even by Ye himself". Riley Wallace of Exclaim! considered that he provided one of the "shiniest gems" on the album with his verse, while Rhian Daly called it "a thrill" in her review for NME.

Commercial performance
"Jail" debuted at number 10 on the US Billboard Hot 100, becoming West's 20th top-10 hit on the chart and making him the 21st act to have this amount of top-10s. The debut was almost entirely driven by streaming, with the song entering the US Streaming Songs chart at number three and amassing 24.2 million streams. The song reached number two on both the US Christian Songs and Gospel Songs charts. It debuted at number three on the US Hot R&B/Hip-Hop Songs chart, standing among West's seven simultaneous top-10 hits that tied him with Drake's record on the chart.

In Australia, "Jail" opened at number five on the ARIA Singles Chart. The song experienced similar performance in New Zealand, entering the NZ Singles Chart at number six. Elsewhere, it reached number eight on the Icelandic Singles Chart. The song debuted at number seven on the Irish Singles Chart, placing among West's three entries from the album in Ireland. It entered the UK Singles Chart at number 11, also standing as one of his three entries in the United Kingdom.

Pt 2
The second part of the song, titled "Jail pt 2", was premiered to a controversial reception at the third and final public listening party at Soldier Field in Chicago on August 26, 2021. It was subsequently released as Dondas 24th track on August 29, 2021. Initially, the song appeared on the album's Spotify track list while blanked out and unavailable to play, until it became playable at 10pm. West posted screenshots to his Instagram of texts between him and his manager Bu Thiam demonstrating that the song was not able to be released due to DaBaby's management refusing to clear his appearance, with West replying: "I'm not taking my brother off. He was the only person who said he would vote for me in public." He also accused Universal Music Group of having blocked the song's inclusion on the album; sources at the company denied the allegations and called them "preposterous".

Charts

Weekly charts

Year-end charts

Certifications

References

2021 songs
Kanye West songs
Song recordings produced by Kanye West
Song recordings produced by Mike Dean (record producer)
Songs written by Dem Jointz
Songs written by Jay-Z
Songs written by Kanye West
Songs written by Mike Dean (record producer)
Jay-Z songs
Songs written by DaBaby
DaBaby songs
Gospel songs
American pop rock songs
American alternative rock songs
Alternative hip hop songs